Schmuck, or shmuck, is a pejorative term meaning one who is stupid or foolish, or an obnoxious, contemptible or detestable person. The word came into the English language from Yiddish (shmok), where it has similar pejorative meanings, but where its literal meaning is a vulgar term for a penis.

Etymology
The Yiddish word shmok derives from Old Polish smok "grass snake, dragon".

In the German language, the word Schmuck means "jewelry, adornment". It is a nominalization of the German verb schmücken "to decorate" and is unrelated to the word discussed in this article.

Euphemisms 

Because of its generally being considered a vulgarity, the word is often euphemized as schmoe, which was the source of Al Capp's cartoon strip creature the shmoo. Other variants include schmo and shmo.

In Jewish-American culture 

Leo Rosten writes in The Joys of Yiddish that schmuck is commonly viewed among Jews  as an obscene word that should not be said lightly. Lenny Bruce, a Jewish stand-up comedian, wrote that the use of the word during his performances in 1962 led to his arrest on the West Coast, "by a Yiddish undercover agent who had been placed in the club several nights running to determine if [his] use of Yiddish terms was a cover for profanity".

In popular culture
Although schmuck is considered an obscene term in Yiddish, it has become a common American idiom for "jerk" or "idiot". It can be taken as offensive, however, by some Jews, particularly those with strong Yiddish roots. Allan Sherman explained in his book The Rape of the A*P*E* that, if a word is used frequently enough, it loses its shock value and comes into common usage without raising any eyebrows.

The term was notably used in the 2010 comedy film Dinner for Schmucks, in which the plot centered on a competition among businessmen to see who could invite the biggest idiot to a monthly dinner. In her review of the film for the New York Times, film critic Debbie Schlussel took issue with the movie's use of the term "schmuck", and with its use of Yiddish at all, adding: “The more correct title would have been ‘Dinner for Schlemiels'.” She added, "At The New York Times, where the word is still considered potentially offensive, the title of [the] film may be mentioned only sparingly. Still, advertisements for the movie would probably pass muster", and suggested that the main characters in the film might be more appropriately called "shmendriks".

In bodybuilding 

In bodybuilding culture, the term "schmoe", or "smos", is used to describe a person, often a wealthy man who is less muscular and weaker than bodybuilders, who pays bodybuilders money for private posing sessions, wrestling, and prostitution.

See also
Joe Shmoe
Lance Corporal Schmuckatelli
List of English words of Yiddish origin
Prick

References

External links

Yiddish Dictionary Online

Yiddish words and phrases
Slurs related to low intelligence
American English words